CORE Education & Technologies Limited was an Indian global education company.

Overview
The company was founded in 2003 and had its business operations in 3 continents. Their international headquarters were located at Atlanta and London. CORE had diversified into an integrated education company and provided solutions to 7 states in India, 3 Caribbean nations, 20 states in the US, 40 Institutions in UK and 8 African countries. They had at one point approximately 3,125 employees worldwide.

CORE was listed on the BSE (SCRIP CODE 512199)& NSE (CoreEDUTECH) and had been rated as 'The Fastest Growing IT Company' in the State of Maharashtra, India. CORE was a CMMi Level 5 and ISO 9001:2008 certified Company.

CORE milestones

2005
CORE enters US Market with the acquisition of first US product company
CORE acquires ECS

2006
CORE achieves a $6.6 million multi-year state contract in Special Education from North Carolina

2007
CORE establishes its presence in the UK with the acquisition of Hamlet, Symbia and a division of Azzuri
CORE acquires KC Management Group

2008
CORE achieved a consolidated annual revenues in excess of US$100 million

2009
CORE acquires, The Princeton Review's K-12 Services division
CORE collaborates with the Oxford University for Teacher Training and Capacity Building

2010
CORE established the CORE Learning Panorama, focusing on K-12 school segment

2011
CORE acquires ITN Mark Education Ltd through its subsidiary Core Education & Consulting Solutions UK Ltd

2016
Forbes reports that CORE "tanked due to [an] unsustainable business model[s] and mounting debt[s]" and that its stock was suspended from trading.

List of acquisitions

The table below gives some details of CORE's key acquisitions:

Key alliances

Center for Higher Learning – NASA
Indira Gandhi National Open University
University of Oxford, UK
 Microsoft Gold Partner
Gujarat Knowledge Society & DVET
Nationteacher.org

References

 

Education companies of India